KZYQ (103.5 FM) was an American radio station licensed to serve Lake Village, Arkansas, United States. The station was most recently owned by Community Broadcast Group, Inc., and the broadcast license was held by M.R.S. Ventures, Inc. When it went off the air permanently in early 2007, it broadcast an urban contemporary music format branded as "Star 103".

The station was assigned the KZYQ call letters by the Federal Communications Commission on March 9, 1998.

Ownership
In September 2003, Community Broadcast Group Inc. (Jerry Russell, president) reached an agreement to purchase six stations, including KZYQ, from Delta Radio Inc. (Larry Fuss, president) for a reported combined sale price of $1.5 million.

In June 2006, the station's owner, Jerry D. Russell, suffered a stroke. The station was being operated by another broadcaster, Hodges Broadcasting LLC, under a local marketing agreement but that operator was unable to obtain the financing to purchase the station. With Hodges gone and Russell unable to operate the station himself, KZYQ went off the air for good in early 2007. In a February 2011 letter to the FCC, the owner indicated that he was surrendering the station's broadcast license as well as the licenses for ten sister stations in similar dire circumstances. On May 2, 2011, the station's license was cancelled and the KZYQ call sign assignment was deleted permanently from the FCC database.

References

ZYQ
Radio stations disestablished in 2011
Defunct radio stations in the United States
Chicot County, Arkansas
2011 disestablishments in Arkansas
ZYQ